Frank Waters (July 25, 1902 – June 3, 1995) was an American writer.  He is known for his novels and historical works about the American Southwest. The Frank Waters Foundation, founded in his name, strives to foster literary and artistic achievement in the Southwest United States.

Biography 
Frank Waters was born on July 25, 1902, in Colorado Springs, Colorado to May Ione Dozier Waters and Frank Jonathon Waters.  His father, who was part Cheyenne, was a key influence in Water's interest in the Native American experience.  Frank Jonathon Waters took his son on trips to the Navajo Reservation in New Mexico in 1911, described by Frank in his book The Colorado.  Frank's interest in his Indian roots was partially a reaction to his father's death on December 20, 1914, when young Frank was twelve years old.

Waters continued his education at Colorado College in Colorado Springs.  He studied engineering but left school before receiving a degree.  Immediately after leaving college, Waters took a job with the Southern California Telephone Company, working in Los Angeles and the surrounding area.  He remained employed by the company until 1935 as an engineer and traffic chief.  Between 1925 and 1935, Waters worked on his first novel, Fever Pitch (1930) and a series of autobiographical novels beginning with The Wild Earth's Nobility (1935).  In 1936, Waters left L.A. and moved back and forth between Colorado and New Mexico, continuing to write and completing a biography of W. S. Stratton, Midas of the Rockies. He became close friends with Mabel Dodge Luhan and her husband from Taos Pueblo, Tony Luhan.

When World War II broke out, Waters moved to Washington, D.C. to work for the Office of the Coordinator of Inter-American Affairs.  There, he performed the duties of a propaganda analyst and chief content officer and, although he was released from the army in 1943, he continued to work for the Office of the Coordinator of Inter-American Affairs. Waters' masterpiece, The Man Who Killed the Deer, was published in 1942.

While living in D.C. in 1944, Waters married Lois Moseley, whom he divorced two years later.  After his divorce, Waters moved to Taos, New Mexico, where he continued to write.  In 1947, Waters purchased property at nearby Arroyo Seco, New Mexico, and married Jane Somervell.  He served as editor-in-chief of Taos' bilingual newspaper,  El Crepusculo from 1949–1951, and as a reviewer for the Saturday Review of Literature from 1950-1956.

In 1953, Waters was awarded the Taos Artists Award for Notable Achievement in the Art of Writing.  Waters also held positions as information consultant for Los Alamos Scientific Laboratory, New Mexico, and for the City of Las Vegas, Nevada, (1952–1956). He held a variety of other jobs, including writer for C.O. Whitney Motion Picture Co., Los Angeles (1957), writer-in-residence at Colorado State University, Fort Collins (1966); and director, New Mexico Arts Commission, Santa Fe, New Mexico, (1966–68).

On December 23, 1979, Waters married Barbara Hayes. He continued to write and make public appearances. He and his wife lived alternately in Arroyo Seco and Sedona, Arizona. Frank Waters died at his home in Arroyo Seco on June 3, 1995.

From the 1930s on, Waters published numerous novels, articles and works of non-fiction. For instance, in 1975, he wrote Mexico Mystique: The Coming Sixth World of Consciousness.  In the book, he makes the case that December 24, 2011, a date he got from Michael Coe's The Maya (1966), will be the closing date of the Mayan Long Count cycle and would initiate a new wave of human consciousness.  

His earlier Book of the Hopi (1963) is written from the perspective of an inner participant in the religious and symbolic dimension of Hopi life. Its contents were relayed to Waters by Hopi Indians, often through a translator/friend called White Bear. There is controversy about the book among scholars. Much of what it says is not scientific, or verifiable. Its value may lay chiefly in the access to the collective unconscious as it is experienced by a person fully immersed in, and shaped by, the Hopi culture. This book has been controversial in recent years. Its authenticity is questioned by some. This may be a reaction to its having been so influential. It is one of the seminal books which introduce the Native American perspective and ethos to mainstream society. It was a counterculture classic and during the sixties and seventies it was a staple on college campuses.

Frank Waters Foundation
The Frank Waters Foundation, established in 1993, is a nonprofit organization the primary goal of which is to promote the arts, specifically those in the spirit of the creativity of Frank Waters.  The members of the foundation operate under the motto "Sheltering the creative spirit", by providing residencies for artists, musicians, and writers to work for short periods of time. The foundation also holds workshops, readings, and exhibits, in addition to publishing.

The Frank Waters Foundation is supported financially by workshops, lectures, art shows, musical events, fundraisers, and sales of various items including books and bronze sculptures of Frank Waters and by income generated by the works of Frank Waters.

Works

Novels
Novels written by Waters include:
Fever Pitch (1930), reprinted as Lizard Woman
The Wild Earth's Nobility (1935)
Below Grass Roots (1937)
Dust Within the Rock (1940)
People of the Valley (1941)
The Man Who Killed the Deer (1942)
River Lady (1942, w/Houston Branch)
The Yogi of Cockroach Court (1947)
Diamond Head (1948 w/Houston Branch)
The Woman at Otowi Crossing (1965)
Pike’s Peak (1972), revision and condensation of The Wild Earth's Nobility, Below Grass Roots, and Dust Within the Rock.
Flight from Fiesta (1986)

Other published works
Other published works, essays, non-fiction, and esoteric writings by Waters include:

Midas of the Rockies (1937)
The Colorado (1946)
Masked Gods: Navajo and Pueblo Ceremonialism (1950)
The Earp Brothers of Tombstone: the Story of Mrs. Virgil Earp (1960)
Book of The Hopi (1963)
Robert Gilruth (1963)
Leon Gaspard (1964)
Pumpkin Seed Point (1969)
To Possess the Land: A Biography of Arthur Rochford Manby (1973)
Mexico Mystique: The Coming Sixth World of Consciousness (1975)
Mountain Dialogues (1981)
Brave Are My People: Indian Heroes Not Forgotten (1993)
Of Time and Change: a Memoir (1998)

Notes

Further reading
Adams, Charles. "Frank Waters" in Western Literature Association (ed.), Updating the Literary West, pp. 854–862. TCU Press, 1997. 
Barclay, Donald A. "Frank (Joseph) Waters." Twentieth-Century American Western Writers: Second Series. Ed. Richard H. Cracroft.  Dictionary of Literary Biography Vol. 212. Detroit: Gale, 1999. . .
Cline, Lynn. Literary Pilgrims: The Santa Fe and Taos Writers' Colonies, 1917-1950, ch. 11. University of New Mexico Press, 2007. 
Deloria, Vine. Frank Waters: Man and Mystic. Swallow Press, 1993. 
Dunaway, David King; Spurgeon, Sara L. Writing the Southwest, pp. 218–232. University of New Mexico Press, 2003. 
Lyon, Thomas J. Frank Waters (Volume 225 of Twayne's United States authors series). Twayne, 1973.
Rogers, Gary Wade. Frank Waters: Author of Vision in the American Tradition of Emerson, Melville, and Faulkner. Texas Christian University, 1993.
Waters, Barbara. Celebrating the Coyote: A Memoir. Divina, 1999. 

Interviews
Evers, Larry, ed. "A Conversation with Frank Waters" in Sun Tracks Five (University of Arizona, Tucson), 1980, pp. 61–68.
Gustafon, Robert. "A Conversation with Frank Waters on American Indian Religion" in Pembroke Magazine (N.C.), 1974, No. 5, pp. 78–89.
Peterson, James. "A Conversation with Frank Waters: Lessons from the Indian Soul" in Psychology Today, 1973, Vol. 6, No. 12, pp. 63–99 passim.
Tarbet, Tom. "The Hopi Prophecy and the Chinese Dream: An Interview with Frank Waters" in East West Journal (Brookline, Mass.), 1977, Vol. 7, No. 5, pp. 52–60, 62, 64.
Taylor, James. "An Interview with Frank Waters" in Black Bear Review (Taos, NM), 1973, Vol. 1, No. 1, pp. 1–5.

External links

 
 Inventory of the Frank Waters Papers, 1892-1992, University of New Mexico, University Libraries, Center for Southwest Research
 Tal Luther Collection of Frank Waters Printed Materials and Papers. Yale Collection of Western Americana, Beinecke Rare Book and Manuscript Library.
 Articles in Western American Literature

1902 births
1995 deaths
Writers from Colorado Springs, Colorado
Writers from Taos, New Mexico
20th-century American novelists
American male novelists
Colorado College alumni
Novelists from Colorado
Novelists from New Mexico
20th-century American male writers
20th-century American non-fiction writers
American male non-fiction writers